David Cochrane Mathers (23 October 1931 – 22 August 2014) was a Scottish footballer, who played as a left-half for Partick Thistle and the Scotland national team.

Mathers joined Partick Thistle from Govan High School in 1947 and turned professional two years later, aged 17. He remained there until September 1959, when he joined Southern League team Headington United. That club changed its name to Oxford United the following summer. Mathers returned to Partick in December 1960, but did not make any more first team appearances for the club. He signed for East Stirlingshire in the summer of 1961 and retired after one season there.

Mathers played once for Scotland, against Finland in what was their final preparation match before the 1954 FIFA World Cup finals. Although named in Scotland's 22-man squad for Switzerland, Scotland decided to take only 13 of the 22 to the finals. Mathers stayed at home on reserve, along with the likes of Bobby Combe and Jimmy Binning. Inside forward George Hamilton was also on reserve, but travelled after Bobby Johnstone withdrew through injury. Mathers also represented the Scottish League once, in 1956.

References

External links

1931 births
2014 deaths
Association football wing halves
Scottish footballers
Scotland international footballers
1954 FIFA World Cup players
Partick Thistle F.C. players
Oxford United F.C. players
East Stirlingshire F.C. players
Scottish Football League players
Scottish Football League representative players
Footballers from Glasgow